Ayad Alkadhi (Arabic: اياد القاضي; born 1971), is a New York Based, Iraqi born artist. Alkadhi's work focuses on the intersection of Near Eastern and Western culture, politics and religion. Arabic calligraphy and Middle Eastern references define much of his work.

Life
Born and raised in Baghdad, Iraq, Alkadhi left Iraq after the first Gulf War. He moved to the United States in 2000. Alkadhi graduated with an MFA from New York University, Tisch School of the Arts.  He currently resides and works in New York City.

Alkadhi’s best known works are:

1: “I am Baghdad” series (2008- 2015). This series references the topic of post occupation Iraq and the emotional struggle of the Iraqi people. http://aalkadhi.com/content/baghdad_ss/

2: “If Words Could Kill) series (2012- 2015). This series is inspired by the traditional art of the. In these works, the written word assumes the shape of a sword, dagger, gun. The topic of this series is the power of words and their impact on self and others.http://aalkadhi.com/content/if%20_words_could_kill/

3: “Umbilical” series (2012). This series references the Arab Spring.http://aalkadhi.com/content/umbilical/

Alkadhi's work has been exhibited at the Honolulu Museum of Art, Nasher Museum of Art, University of Michigan Museum of Art, Nevada Museum of Art, Los Angeles Municipal Art Gallery, Queens Museum of Art, Herbert Johnson Museum, the Austrian Cultural forum, Station Museum of Contemporary Art and New York University's Bronfman's Centre ; the Station Museum of Contemporary Art in Houston, Texas; the European Parliament in Brussels.

Contemporary Art in the Middle East, a book published by Black Dog Publishing, also features his work.

See also
 Iraqi art
 Islamic art
 List of Iraqi artists

References

External links 
Official site
https://instagram.com/ayadalkadhi/
https://www.facebook.com/pages/Ayad-Alkadhi/109528872431228?ref=ts
http://ayadalkadhi.tumblr.com/
https://www.pinterest.com/aalkadhiart/
https://twitter.com/Ayad_Alkadhi
https://www.youtube.com/watch?v=4gZjJwJB66U
https://www.bing.com/videos/search?q=ayad+alkadhi&FORM=HDRSC3#view=detail&mid=621D943F8BA3811FB0F8621D943F8BA3811FB0F8
https://vimeo.com/121711085
"Ayad Alkadhi", Artnet
Forbes Magazine
Forbes Magazine
Video art profiles of Ayad Alkadhi
 http://www.barjeelartfoundation.org/artist/iraq/ayad-alkadhi/
 https://web.archive.org/web/20151220151805/http://www.stationmuseum.com/index.php/exhibitions/19-exhibitions/174-iraqi-artists-in-exile-ayad-alkadhi
 http://www.contemporarypractices.net/essays/volume%20VII/Ayad%20Alkadhi.pdf
 https://www.academia.edu/1492790/_Abu_Ghraib_in_the_Art_of_Ayad_Alkadhi_
 http://collections.lacma.org/node/773223
 http://www.artsobserver.com/2012/02/23/referencing-experiences-in-iraq-ayad-alkadhis-canvases-are-both-bright-and-serious/
http://artradarjournal.com/2015/08/07/i-am-baghdad-ayad-alkadhi-video-review/

1971 births
Artists from Baghdad
Calligraphers of Arabic script
Iraqi painters
Iraqi contemporary artists
Iraqi calligraphers
Living people
Tisch School of the Arts alumni